A Touch of Zen (Chinese: 俠女) is a 1971 taiwanese wuxia film co-edited, written, and directed by King Hu. Its screenplay is based on a classic Chinese story "Xianü" in the book Strange Stories from a Chinese Studio by Pu Songling. The film is set in the Ming dynasty under the dominance of eunuchs and narrates multiple themes of transcendence of dichotomies, Zen Buddhism, feminism, conservative female roles, and the ghost story. At the 1975 Cannes Film Festival, the film won the Technical Grand Prize award.

The film was produced in Taiwan and funded by the Union Film Company. Because the director Hu was a filmmaker in the Shaw Brothers Studio before moving to Taiwan, the emergence of the film established the international visibility of the Hong Kong New Wave. Although filming began in 1968, A Touch of Zen was not completed until 1971. The original Taiwanese release was in two parts in 1970 and 1971 (filming was still ongoing when the first part was released) with the bamboo forest sequence that concludes Part 1 reprised at the beginning of Part 2; this version has a combined run time of 200 minutes. In November 1971, both parts of the film were combined into one for the Hong Kong market with a run time of 187 minutes.

Plot

Set in a remote mountain village in Ming China, the 14th century CE, the story is largely seen through the eyes of Gu, a well-meaning but unambitious scholar and painter, with a tendency towards being clumsy and ineffectual. A stranger arrives in town and requests his portrait painted by Gu, but his real objective is to bring a female fugitive back to the city for execution on behalf of the East Chamber guards. The fugitive, Yang, is befriended by Gu, and together they plot against the corrupt Eunuch Wei who wants to eradicate all trace of her family after her father attempts to warn the Emperor of the eunuch's corruption. His daughter fled, and the saintly and powerful Abbot Hui Yuan intervened to protect them.

The stranger, Yang and her friends are all superior warriors. The stranger has a special flexible sword that bends and that he can wear within his belt, making him seem unarmed.

One of the unique aspects of the film is that Gu is a non-combatant all the way through the film and only becomes involved when he sleeps with Yang. Upon doing so, he is no longer the naïve bumbling innocent, but instead becomes confident and assertive, and when Yang's plight is revealed, he insists on being part of it – and even comes up with a fiendish "Ghost Trap" for the East Chamber guards. This is a plan to use a supposedly haunted site to play tricks on the guards to make them believe they are prey to the undead.

In the aftermath, Gu walks through the carnage laughing at the ingenuity of his plan until the true cost of human life dawns upon him. He sees Abbot Hui and his followers arrive to help bury the dead.

After the battle, Gu is unable to find Yang, who he is told has left him and does not want him to follow her. He tracks her down at the monastery of Abbot Hui, where she has given birth to a child by Gu and become a nun. She tells Gu that their destiny together has ended and gives Gu their child. Later, when Gu and the child are tracked down by Hsu Hsien-Chen, the evil commander of Eunuch Wei's army, Yang and General Shi come to Gu's rescue. Abbot Hui and four of his monks also arrive to fight Hsu. After Hsu fakes repentance in order to surprise attack Abbot Hui, a battle begins in which Hsu is killed and Yang, Shi, and Abbot Hui are all badly injured (the latter bleeding golden blood). The film famously ends with the injured Yang staggering toward a silhouetted figure, presumably Abbot Hui, seen meditating with the setting sun forming a halo around his head, an image suggesting the Buddha and enlightenment.

Cast
Hsu Feng as Yang Hui-zhen, the main protagonist, a female knight-errant.
Shih Chun as Gu Sheng-tsai, a scholar and painter who later involves in Jianghu.
Bai Ying as General Shi Wen-qiao who assists Yang to escape when disguising as a blind person
Xue Han as General Lu Ding-an who protests Yang when disguising as a doctor of Traditional Chinese medicine
Roy Chiao as Abbot Hui-yuan, a Zen monk 
Tien Peng as Ouyang Nian who works for the Eastern Depot
Cao Jian as Xu Zheng-qing, local magistrate
Zhang Bing-yu as Sheng-tsai's mother
Wang Rui as Men Da or Mun Ta
Miao Tien as Nie Qiu, one of Mun Ta's advisors
Han Ying-chieh as Chief Commander Xu Xian-chun
Wan Zhong-shan as Lu Qiang
Liu Chu as one of the Magistrate's men
Gao Ming as one of the Magistrate's men
Lu Zhi as Mun Ta's guard
Jia Lushi as Yang Lian, the protagonist Yang's father 
Cheung Wen-men as Tao Lung
Jackie Chen Sao Lung (uncredited stuntman not to be confused with Jackie Chan)
Long Fei as a guard
Sammo Hung as guard/soldier

Production

Development
A Touch of Zen was shot in Taiwan by King Hu and was funded by Taiwanese production company Union Film Company. In his book on the film, Stephen Teo suggested that the film has roots in Hong Kong cinema, noting the bulk of both Taiwanese and Hong Kong actors and crew members. With Hu's idea of invoking traditional Chinese culture in his films, A Touch of Zen contains Beijing opera scores and references to Chinese poetry like Li Bai's well-known poem "Drinking Alone in the Moonlight".

The bamboo forest sword fight, a ten-minute confrontation, is said to have taken twenty-five days to shoot. It is choreographed by Han Yingjie, a former Beijing opera actor and the action director of A Touch of Zen. Hu explained proudly of the trial and error he went through in the creative process and concluded that he had put together many scenes in less than eight frames challenging the “golden rule” of cinema.

Adaptation
Hu based the screenplay of A Touch of Zen on the ghost story of Xia Nü in Liaozhai Zhiyi, an anthology by Pu Songling. He arranged the credit of Liaozhai Zhiyi as the first title card right after the company logo in the film, even before the film title. In Pu Songling’s original story, the male scholar does not pursue being a knight-errant and the separation between wen and wu. However, the film modifies the character’s attributes and instead leads the scholar to adapt knight-errant and restore the country from the corrupted dominance of the eunuchs.

Cinematography
Director Hu adopted the classic techniques of montages, including eye-line matches and shot-reverse-shot. He also used jump cuts to create the speed of motions in action effects and applied blocked shots as his signature on evacuating the space before actions take place. Hu also creates "the glimpsing effect" (also called point-of-view shot) to provide a new perspective to audiences. "The glimpsing effect" allows the audience to see the perspective of Gu.

Themes

Transcendence of dichotomies
The function of knight-errantry alludes to civic values (wen) and martial conducts (wu) in the discourse, arising reflections of experiences and justice beyond dichotomies between wen and wu, good and evil. The director Hu develops an individual perspective of what nation is and transcends the limited dialectics of a totalitarian regime versus a more benevolent government.

Zen Buddhism

The theme of Buddhism is in opposition to Confucianism and offers the ideas of transcendence and redemption. Scholar James Steinstrage considers that the unambitious scholar Gu's involvement in Jianghu and the unexplained motivation of Yang Huizhen's sexual intercourse with Gu lead to absurdity and vacuity, which matches the concept of emptiness in Zen Buddhism. Paradoxically, the Zen ideologies are not profound in the film and the translated film title A Touch of Zen can be a marketing strategy to attract Western audiences and recall exoticism. On the other hand, film commentator Tony Rayns, in his commentary in Criterion Collection's home video release, considers the second half of the film involving Zen monks the origin of the title.

Feminism and conservative womanhood
The film presents Xia Nü Yang in the paradoxical image of female roles. She delivers a son to continue Gu's family line as a traditional mother and help fulfill Gu's filial piety, revealing the dominance of patriarchy in society. From a feminist perspective, she also has the initiative to end her relationship with Gu and reject the feudalistic values of women's obligation to men.

The ghost story
Based on the fact that Director Hu's interests in a Chinese genre shengguai (which means gods and spirits), the haunted house as the setting and death traps jiguang suggest Gu's encounters and ally with the supernatural ghosts. The film adopts the motifs of "Liaozhai gothic", including the goldenrod and alarm system that alerts the unexpected visitors in the haunted house.

Scholarship and beauty
The film depicts the romantic relationships between a scholar, Gu, and a pretty female knight-errant, Yang, referring to the classic theme of scholar and beauty Caizijiaren in Chinese literature.

Reception

Box office
A Touch of Zen failed at the box-office when it was released in two instalments in Taiwan in 1970 and 1971. The film only ran one week in the cinema and failed because of its themes of ambiguous sexuality and feminist sensibility. In 1971, the film again failed to receive recognition with its release in Hong Kong due to the overwhelming success of Bruce Lee's movie The Big Boss. The film grossed HK$678,320.9 in Hong Kong. It was not until the full three-hour version was revived for a screening at the 1975 Cannes Film Festival that A Touch of Zen gained wide attention.

Review and criticism
Gina Marchetti considers that the genre of the film as wuxia is a new emergence in the Hong Kong New Wave and writes, "although produced in Taiwan after Hu had left Hong Kong, the international accolades for this film brought the “new” cinema of Hong Kong much greater visibility, while providing an art house alternative to the enormous international popularity of Bruce Lee"

For the Criterion Collection author David Bordwell wrote, "The story is simple, but the treatment is complex. No Shaw film would have delayed the basic exposition so cunningly. And no Shaw film would have presented heroic swordplay through the eyes of a secondary character. Yet by building the plot around Gu, Hu creates a protagonist-as-witness."

Writing for the Journal of Cinema and Media Studies, academic Héctor Rodríguez noted of the film, "In that film...the director's use of elliptical cuts, diegetic insert shots, and other strategies of visual fragmentation allows characters to float magically through the air across long distances, to reach impossibly high altitudes in a single superhuman leap, and to change direction miraculously in midair."

In his book, King Hu's A Touch of Zen, academic Stephen Teo wrote that, "this final reduction of the mythical female knight-errant figure into human status is meant to provoke us into a philosophical understanding of ourselves. The subject of Buddhist transcendence is Hu’s way of delivering the ultimate critique of the genre’s raison d’être which is the audience’s wish-fulfilment for heroes to save them from their own vulnerability."

Accolades
The film was awarded the Technical Grand Prize and nominated for the Palme d'Or at the 1975 Cannes Film Festival. It became the second Chinese-language film to win an award at the Cannes Film Festival and the first wuxia film to win at an international film festival.

At the 24th Hong Kong Film Awards various Asian film critics, filmmakers and actors voted for the top Chinese films from Hong Kong, Taiwan and China. A Touch of Zen was listed at 9th place on the list. In 2011, the Tapei Golden Horse Film Festival had 122 industry professionals take part in the survey. The voters included film scholars, festival programmers, film directors, actors and producers to vote for the 100 Greatest Chinese-Language Films. A Touch of Zen was listed at 15th place on the list.

In 2021, The Daily Star ranked A Touch of Zen 4th on its list of the greatest short story adaptations, writing "Influencing future classics like Crouching Tiger, Hidden Dragon and House of Flying Daggers, there is perhaps no greater film as influential and as underappreciated".

Home media
A Touch of Zen was released on DVD for the North American market on 10 December 2002, by Tai Seng Entertainment, with only King Hu's biography and filmography as extras. The film was also released on PAL DVD for the British market on 28 July 2003, by Optimum Releasing (now StudioCanal UK), as well as for the German market on 10 April 2008, by KSM GmbH as part of their "King Hu Collection". The film was released on PAL DVD in France on 1 September 2004, as simply Touch of Zen by Films sans Frontières (Films Without Borders), which has both French and English subtitles.

After the film's 4K restoration in 2015, the film's first Blu-ray release was by Eureka Entertainment for the Masters of Cinema series, released on 25 January 2016, for the British market, which also includes a DVD edition of the film. Both editions include a select scene commentary by critic Tony Rayns, the film's theatrical trailer, and newly translated English subtitles, as well as a 36-page booklet which features director King Hu's statement from the 1975 Cannes Film Festival, a 1975 interview with the director by Rayns, the short story the film was based on, eight characteristics of "the swordswoman" in King Hu's films, and archival images. A limited-edition version of the Blu-ray and DVD adds a 2012 documentary about King Hu and a new essay by filmmaker David Cairns.

On 19 July 2016, American home video company The Criterion Collection released the film on Blu-ray and DVD using the same 4K restoration also used by the Masters of Cinema release. Both the Blu-ray and DVD include the 2012 documentary about King Hu, new interviews with the actors Hsu Feng and Shih Chun, filmmaker Ang Lee, and film scholar Tony Rayns, the theatrical 4K re-release trailer, and newly translated English subtitles, as well as a leaflet containing a new essay by film critic and theorist David Bordwell and King Hu's notes from the 1975 Cannes Film Festival. The new Blu-ray and DVD cover and interior poster (combined with the leaflet) was illustrated by Greg Ruth and designed by Eric Skillman.

Sources

External links

Review by Dennis Schwartz
Interview with King Hu on the making of A Touch of Zen
Ang Lee on King Hu - A Touch of Art - interview with Ang Lee about King Hu and his movie A Touch of Zen (video, 13:35 mins)
A Touch of Zen: Prowling, Scheming, Flying an essay by David Bordwell at the Criterion Collection

1971 martial arts films
1971 films
Films directed by King Hu
Hong Kong martial arts films
Taiwanese martial arts films
Wuxia films
Films released in separate parts
Films shot in Hong Kong
Films shot in Taiwan
Films set in 14th-century Ming dynasty
Kung fu films
Films based on Strange Stories from a Chinese Studio
Films set in the Ming dynasty
1970s Hong Kong films